Werauhia pycnantha is a plant species in the genus Werauhia. This species is native to Mexico.

References

pycnantha
Flora of Mexico